Tom Hertz is an American producer and screenwriter. He is the creator of the American sitcom television series Rules of Engagement. Hertz won an Primetime Emmy Award and was nominated for one more in the category Outstanding Writing for a Variety Series for his work on the television program Dennis Miller Live.

References

External links 

Living people
Place of birth missing (living people)
Year of birth missing (living people)
American male screenwriters
American television writers
American male television writers
American television producers
Primetime Emmy Award winners
Showrunners